Ruby is an American ghost town in Okanogan County, Washington State.

Silver was discovered in 1886 on the slopes of Ruby Mountain and Peacock Hill. By 1887 a mining district was created and a camp grew up beside Salmon Creek. This camp was called Ruby, or Ruby City.

Ruby had a population of 700. By 1888, 70 buildings were located along the main street. In 1888, Ruby was briefly declared the county seat. A publication called the Ruby Miner advertised the mineral richness of the area. When the Panic of 1893 caused silver prices to plummet, Ruby was slowly abandoned, becoming, eventually, a ghost town.

References

Ghost towns in Washington (state)
Geography of Okanogan County, Washington
Populated places established in 1887
Mining communities in Washington (state)